"Charmed Again" is a two-part story arc and the season opening of the fourth season of the American television series Charmed; it is also the 67th and 68th overall episodes in the series. Written by Brad Kern and directed by Michael Schultz and Mel Damski, the episodes were originally broadcast in the United States on October 4, 2001 on The WB. The series follows a trio of sisters, known as The Charmed Ones, the most powerful good witches of all time, who use their combined "Power of Three" to protect innocent lives from evil beings such as demons and warlocks.

The story arc deals with the cliffhanger of the season three finale, which featured Prue and Piper dying, and Phoebe trapped in the Underworld. It's revealed that while Phoebe managed to escape with the help of Leo and Cole and get to her sisters, managing to save Piper, Prue had already succumbed to her injuries. While dealing with the fallout of Prue's death, Piper and Phoebe find out that they have a long-lost half-sister, Paige Matthews. After reconstituting the Power of Three and vanquishing Shax, the two of them try to prevent the Source of All Evil from corrupting Paige into evil.

The episode marked the first appearance of Rose McGowan as the long-lost younger half-sister Paige Matthews, following the departure of Shannen Doherty. In the episode, The Charmed Ones deal with the aftermath of the events in the season three finale "All Hell Breaks Loose" and the reconstruction of the Power of Three.

Plot

Background
Charmed initially focused on the three Halliwell sisters, Prue (Shannen Doherty), Piper (Holly Marie Combs) and Phoebe (Alyssa Milano), who are known as the most powerful good witches of all time in the supernatural community. They live their everyday lives battling demons and warlocks in modern-day San Francisco, while still trying to have a normal life.

"Charmed Again (Part 1)" carries on from the previous season three finale episode "All Hell Breaks Loose", where Prue and Piper unwittingly exposed themselves as witches to the world after being caught on camera by a local news crew fighting with the demon Shax (Michael Bailey Smith), the personal assassin of The Source of All Evil. Meanwhile, Phoebe ventured into The Underworld to save her demon boyfriend Cole Turner (Julian McMahon) from his dark side. In the aftermath of the exposure, Piper was shot and killed by a crazed Wiccan fanatic who wanted to join the sisters' coven. In order to save Piper's life, Prue ordered Leo Wyatt (Brian Krause) to find Phoebe and pass on a deal to The Source to turn back time. The Source agreed, knowing that he had planned to double cross her in the end as Phoebe would be immune to the time reset while in The Underworld. Time was reversed to the sisters' first encounter with Shax, however Phoebe no longer answered when Prue called for help, as she was never sent back. The season three finale then ended on a cliffhanger with Piper and Prue left for dead after losing in the fight against Shax. Meanwhile, Phoebe remained trapped in The Underworld.

In "Charmed Again (Part 1)", it is revealed that Phoebe was rescued from The Underworld by Leo and Cole. However, because of this they arrived too late and were only able to heal Piper of her injuries from the season three finale cliffhanger. Prue's injuries from Shax were too severe and she was unable to be saved.

Part 1
Piper, who is distraught at losing Prue, is seen in the attic casting numerous spells to resurrect her, but to no avail. After Phoebe convinces Piper to leave the attic to get some rest before Prue's funeral, the triquetra on the Book of Shadows glows red, and the book opens to the last spell Piper tried, "To Call a Lost Witch". The spell calls a young woman named Paige Matthews (Rose McGowan), who is first shown working as an assistant at South Bay Social Services. While at work, Paige notices that a candle at her desk mysteriously blows out. Suddenly, lights swirl around her head, and a newspaper magically drops out of thin air behind her. Paige is shocked to read that the newspaper article is Prue's obituary, and leaves work to attend her funeral. Meanwhile, in the Underworld, The Source (Ben Guillory) consults his Oracle (Krista Allen), who looks into her crystal ball and tells The Source she sees another possible Charmed One. At the end of the funeral, Paige approaches Phoebe and they meet for the first time, both unaware they are sisters. After shaking hands, Phoebe falls over from getting a premonition of Paige being attacked by Shax. Paige quickly leaves, and soon after several demonic bounty hunters turn up and attack Cole. Although he and Phoebe manage to fight them off, Piper is furious and yells at everyone to stop fighting so they can bury Prue in peace.

Back at The Manor, Phoebe and Cole agree to try and protect Paige from Shax, despite the fact that they cannot go up against him without the Power of Three. Meanwhile, Piper tries to summon Prue with another spell, but the spell summons her grandmother Penny (Jennifer Rhodes) instead. Penny reveals to Piper that Prue is still struggling to adjust to being in the afterlife, and that she and their mother Patty (Finola Hughes) are helping Prue to process her actual death. Penny also reveals that Prue cannot be summoned back to Earth because seeing Prue would not allow the sisters to grieve and move on to continue their destiny. In the Underworld, The Source again consults the Oracle, who looks into her crystal ball and tells him that Paige's life appears to be short-lived.

Whilst on a date with a man named Shane, Paige explains her life story, saying that she was adopted and is a reformed alcoholic who thought that she was related to the Halliwell sisters, but had dismissed it due to Patty dying young. Paige and Shane venture to a roof top where they are attacked by Shax. Cole and Phoebe who had been waiting for the attack to save Paige and are able to wound Shax. Leo and Cole do some investigating after Phoebe reports back that they saw her orb and Cole states that the Source thinks that Paige may be their sister - hence why he sent Shax after her. Piper then calls Grams to get her to explain, but as the truth is revealed they are exposed. Inspector Darryl Morris arrives with Inspector Cortez the man in charge of Prue's murder investigation. Cortez threatens to expose them before Morris knocks him out. The four witches send Cortez to Timbuktu and Cole goes to find him to take him home. Paige arrives at the house and the three realise that they are sisters when Shax attacks. The reformed Charmed Ones are able to finally vanquish Shax, but a scared and confused Paige runs out of the house.

Part 2
Shax died in his attempt on Paige's life, but the Oracle tells the Source that she hasn't solidified her bond with Piper and Phoebe yet. He thus still has a chance to shatter the Power of Three. The Oracle says that it was agreed years ago that every newly minted witch should have 48 hours to decide whether to use her powers for good or evil, the so-called "Window of Opportunity." She suggests that the Source seduce Paige into turning evil. This would be an even greater victory than killing her; not only will the Power of Three be permanently shattered, but he'd have a powerful evil witch on his side. To that end, the Source goes to Shane, still in the hospital recovering from Shax' attack, and possesses him. Paige comes to visit him, still badly shaken. They embrace, and Shane's eyes turn black.

Darryl comes to the manor, asking after Inspector Cortez. Cole shimmers in, and after blasting a couple of bounty hunters, tells that he found Cortez. He also says that he heard gargoyles stirring; he thinks they may be trying to ward off the Source. Leo thinks that if they can find Paige, they should be able to ward him off. However, he still can't sense her. "Shane" goes to Paige's apartment. Her parakeet, Oscar, seems oddly agitated. "Shane" mentions the case that Paige is working on. Jake Grisanti is suspected of abusing his young son; abusive parents are one of Paige's pet peeves. As Paige turns to leave, "Shane" sends Oscar up in flames. Cole and Leo find Cortez about to fall into a lava pit. Cole put him there to make sure he doesn't expose the sisters. Cole is unwilling to bring him back, but Leo insists that they let him go. Leo demands that Cortez keep quiet about the Halliwells, and then orbs him back to San Francisco. Jake arrives at South Bay Social Services with his wife, Carol, and their son. Jake goes to the bathroom, where the Source leaves Shane's body and possesses him. Meanwhile, Paige is asking after the church she was placed, and argues with her boss, Bob Cowan. She is worried about the boy. Piper walks into Prue's room to find Phoebe standing at the window, crying bitterly. It's the first time she's really broken down since Prue's death; she's held it together for both of them. Cowan hasn't made a final decision yet on the Grisantis, much to Paige's frustration. "Jake" briefly argues with Paige. Paige heads out for the church. "Jake" goes back to the bathroom, where a custodian is bending over an unconscious Shane. The Source sends the man up in flames and repossesses Shane.

Paige finds Sister Agnes, who placed her for adoption. Sister Agnes tells Paige of her birth parents; they came to her in a swirl of blue lights. Sister Agnes shows Paige her blanket in which she was wrapped, showing the letter P. Her mother had requested that her name begin with P. Piper has also found the church where Paige was left. She and Phoebe find Paige there and Piper freezes Sister Agnes. Paige walks away angrily, but Piper and Phoebe tell her that she has a power, and needs to learn how to use it to protect herself. Piper tells Paige that in all likelihood, she's a telekinetic like Prue. Paige tries to practice on a candle, but can't move it by waving her hand or squinting her eyes (the ways Prue channeled her power). Paige grumbles that she must be of little account as a witch if she can't move a candle. Just then, the candle disappears in a swirl of orbs and reappears in a shocked Paige's hand. Piper and Phoebe think Paige's telekinesis works differently due to her being half-Whitelighter. The Source has again possessed Shane and tries to enter the church, but a gargoyle repels him. He falls down in front of the door, but Paige goes to him and they leave. "Shane" blasts Phoebe and Piper as he and Paige walk away. Cortez is still determined to expose the sisters, despite threats from Cole and Darryl. He calls a surveillance team.

Piper and Phoebe realize the Source was at the church, but don't know why he didn't try to kill Paige. Cole doesn't understand either. Leo speculates that the Source isn't trying to kill her anymore, but instead turn her evil. Cole remembers the window of opportunity, which has less than 24 hours to run. "Shane" is back at Paige's apartment and is comforting her. Paige is still confused by all that's happening. Piper and Phoebe search the Book of Shadows to help find Paige; Phoebe calls for "a little help" and the Book opens to a spell that can reveal evil. They don't know where to find the Source, but Leo thinks Cole can find him. Phoebe doesn't understand how that's possible. Cole points out that all demons can sense the Source's presence; it's how he reminds them of his power. He thinks that if he can focus on the Source's aura, they'll be able to find him. Phoebe and Piper cast the spell on a pair of sunglasses. Phoebe puts the shades on and they reveal Cole as Belthazor, startling her. Phoebe thanks Grams for helping them, but Piper thinks "somebody else" may have actually flipped the page. "Shane" tries to persuade Paige to use her powers for her own desires. He suggests that she use her power to kill Jake. She ends up smashing a mirror. Later that day, Jake and Carol storm out of Cowan's office. Paige follows them, with "Shane" looking on. As they head outside, Paige holds out her hand and calls for Jake's heart. Jake doubles over in pain. Phoebe, Piper, Cole and Leo pull up; Cole sensed the Source was there. Phoebe puts on the sunglasses and sees a black aura around Paige. They rush to Paige and try to snap her back to herself. Paige won't back down, but Piper knocks her hand down and Leo orbs her away. Jake recovers, and it turns out that Carol is the one beating their child.

Piper and Phoebe head home while Cole stays behind to hold off the Source. "Shane" comes up behind Cole, but flames away before Cole spots him. Cole shimmers after him, but before he can make a move "Shane" runs him through with a sword. Piper and Phoebe find Paige and Leo at the manor. Leo is trying to convince Paige she isn't evil, but Paige is pitching a fit and orbing things at him while trying to escape. Piper tackles Paige to immobilize her, and Phoebe and Leo take her place holding Paige down. Just as Piper is about to check the Book, "Shane" flames in and flings Piper through the banister. "Shane" throws an energy ball at Phoebe, but Phoebe levitates out of the way. While still in the air, she tries to kick "Shane," but he disappears and Phoebe crashes into the grandfather clock. "Shane" reappears, and Piper blasts him. Just as "Shane" reconstitutes, Phoebe puts on the sunglasses and sees the Source. Paige gets back to her feet. The Source tries again to sway Paige, changing in rapid succession into Cowan, then Carol, then the little boy. Phoebe cries out, and the "boy" blasts Phoebe with electricity. Paige shoves the "boy" down just as the clock chimes; the window of opportunity has closed. The Source implies that he attacked Cole. Just then, he spots Cortez with a camcorder, blasts him with an plasma ball and flames away. Leo immediately heals Cortez, replying to Paige's wonder at how he did that by stating that whitelighters heal good people. Both Paige and Cortez realize fully who the good guys are. The sisters, with Paige, and Leo find Cole. Leo can only heal his human half, but Paige offers to use her power as well. Together, the two heal Cole. Cortez goes to Darryl and wordlessly hands over the tape from the camcorder, ending his pursuit of the sisters. The sisters meet at P3, Paige now joining them. Phoebe curiously asks why she attended Prue's funeral. She explains that a part of her felt like she'd lost her too, and somehow felt drawn all three of them. Piper and Phoebe take her to the attic and cast the summoning spell; Paige and Patty meet for the first time.

Production

Charmed Again is the two-part premiere of Charmed's fourth season and has a total running time of one hour, 26 minutes and 17 seconds.

Reception

References

2001 American television episodes
Charmed (TV series) episodes
Television episodes about funerals